O Concurso is a 2013 Brazilian comedy film directed by Pedro Vasconcellos. The film was released in Brazil on July 19, 2013.

Cast 
 Danton Mello as Caio
 Fábio Porchat as Rogério Carlos
 Rodrigo Pandolfo as Bernardinho
 Anderson Di Rizzi as Freitas
 Sabrina Sato as Martinha Pinéu
 Jackson Antunes as pai Rogério's father
 Pedro Paulo Rangel
 Nelson Freitas as Pai Preto
 Carol Castro as Mariana
 Érico Brás as Drag Queen
 Oscar Calixto as Drag Queen

References

External links
 

2013 films
Brazilian comedy films
Films shot in Rio de Janeiro (city)
2013 comedy films